Reinvention may refer to:

 Reinvention (Superchick album), 2010
 Reinvention, a 1999 album by Crumbächer

See also
 Re-Invention, a 2004 album by Too Rude
 Re-Invention World Tour, a 2004 concert tour by Madonna
 Da Derrty Versions: The Reinvention, a 2003 album by Nelly
 Reinventing You, a 2013 book by executive education professor Dorie Clark
 Reinvention method, a business methodology used by an educator Dr. Nadya Zhexembayeva
 Re-inventing the wheel